Eucalyptus latisinensis, commonly known as white mahogany, is a species of tree that is endemic to Queensland. It has rough, fibrous to stringy bark, lance-shaped to curved adult leaves, flower buds in groups of seven to eleven or more, white flowers and shortened spherical to hemispherical fruit.

Description
The bark extends from the trunk to the small branches and is rough, finely fibrous to stringy and grey to grey-brown. Flowering occurs has been observed in August and the flowers are white.

Taxonomy
Eucalyptus latisinensis was first formally described in 1999 by the botanist Kenneth Hill from a specimen he collected from near Lowmead in 1996. The description was published in the journal Telopea. The specific epithet (latisinensis) is derived from the Latin words latus meaning "broad" or "wide" and sinus meaning "a bay" with the ending ensis indicating place of origin, referring to the distribution of this species near Wide Bay.

Eucalyptus latisinensis is part of the white mahogany group as recognised by Ken Hill. Others in the group include E. acmenoides, E. mediocris, E. carnea, E. apothalassica, E. helidonica, E. psammitica and E. umbra.

Conservation status
This eucalypt is classified as "least concern" under the Queensland Government Nature Conservation Act 1992.

See also

List of Eucalyptus species

References

Trees of Australia
latisinensis
Myrtales of Australia
Flora of Queensland
Plants described in 1999